Puritanical bias refers to the tendency to attribute cause of an undesirable outcome or wrongdoing by an individual to a moral deficiency or lack of self control rather than taking into account the impact of broader societal determinants.  An example might be, "These people sit around all day in their apartments on welfare watching TV, but won't take the time to get out and find a job!"  In this case, a selection of persons might have existed for some time under dire economic and/or socially oppressive circumstances, but individuals from that selection have been cognitively dis-empowered by these circumstances to decide or act on decisions to obtain a given goal.

References

Bias
Cognitive biases
Moral psychology
Social psychology